Joy Lynn Fawcett (born February 8, 1968) is a retired American professional soccer player. She earned 241 caps with the United States women's national soccer team (WNT) and retired from the WNT in 2004 as the highest scoring defender for the U.S. WNT. Fawcett was a founding member of the WUSA and was elected for induction into the National Soccer Hall of Fame in 2009. She was in the movie Soccer Mom as herself.

Youth
Fawcett grew up in southern California, where she attended Edison High School in Huntington Beach, California.  Her high school team won four league championships.  She then attended the University of California, Berkeley where she played on the women's soccer team from 1987 to 1989.  She was a three-time, first team All-American.  She holds the school record for single-season scoring with 23 goals in 1987.  Fawcett graduated from UC Berkeley in 1992 with a BA degree in Physical Education.  Cal inducted her into the school's Hall of Fame in October 1997.

Club
Fawcett and forward Carin Jennings both were members of the Manhattan Beach club women's soccer team Ajax in the late 1980s and early 1990s and routinely played at Columbia Park in Torrance, California. In 1991 and 1993, Ajax won the U.S. women's amateur championship.  In 1998, she played for Ajax in the first season of the Women's Premier Soccer League.  In 2001, Fawcett signed with the San Diego Spirit in the newly established Women's United Soccer Association.  She missed most of the season due to an early season pregnancy.  She rebounded in 2002 to lead the team in playing time with 19 games.  In 2003, she had ankle injury early in the season but came back to play 18 games and gain the first team WUSA All - Star recognition.

National team
In 1991, Fawcett and Jennings helped the U.S. national team win the first women's World Cup that was held in China.    She was the only WNT member to play all minutes of the 1995, 1999 and 2003 Women's World Cups, as well as the 1996 and 2000 Olympics.  She retired from the WNT in 2004 as the highest-scoring defender for the U.S. WNT.

She appeared in the HBO documentary Dare to Dream: The Story of the U.S. Women's Soccer Team.

International goals

Coaching career
She was the head coach at UCLA from 1993 to 1997.

Personal life
Joy and her husband Walter Fawcett have three daughters, Katelyn Rose (b. May 17, 1994), Carli (b. May 21, 1997), and Madilyn Rae (b. June 5, 2001). Their oldest daughter Katey played soccer for the University of Washington from 2012 to 2015. Her brother Eric Biefeld had a brief career with the United States men's national soccer team. She is also the current assistant soccer coach for the United States Deaf Women's National Team.

References 

Joy Fawcett's U.S. Olympic Team bio

External links
 Official Player Profile
 National Soccer Hall of Fame profile

1968 births
Living people
American women's soccer players
California Golden Bears women's soccer players
National Soccer Hall of Fame members
United States women's international soccer players
Olympic gold medalists for the United States in soccer
Olympic silver medalists for the United States in soccer
Footballers at the 1996 Summer Olympics
Footballers at the 2000 Summer Olympics
Footballers at the 2004 Summer Olympics
Women's United Soccer Association players
San Diego Spirit players
Washington Freedom players
FIFA Century Club
Sportspeople from Inglewood, California
1991 FIFA Women's World Cup players
1995 FIFA Women's World Cup players
1999 FIFA Women's World Cup players
2003 FIFA Women's World Cup players
FIFA Women's World Cup-winning players
Women's association football defenders
Medalists at the 2004 Summer Olympics
Medalists at the 2000 Summer Olympics
Medalists at the 1996 Summer Olympics
UCLA Bruins women's soccer coaches
American women's soccer coaches
Ajax America Women players
Women's Premier Soccer League players